Pereverzev (Russian: Переверзев) is a Russian masculine surname, its feminine counterpart is Pereverzeva. It may refer to
Natalia Pereverzeva (born 1988), Russian model
Nikolai Pereverzev (born 1986), Russian futsal player
Ivan Pereverzev (1914–1978), Soviet actor
Viktor Pereverzev (born 1958), Azerbaijani former rower
Valerian Fedorovich Pereverzev (1882–1968), Soviet literary scholar

Russian-language surnames